Laith Shubbar is an Iraqi academic and politician He was an advisor of the Iraqi Prime Minister and opposed to quotas and sectarianism. He earned his doctorate in 1999 and has held many political and media positions.

He has written many articles, research and publications in the fields of politics, economics, culture and sociology. As head of the Energy and Water Development Center, he worked on major national issues such as energy, water and the environment. He actively participated in restoring life to the Iraqi marshes and inscribing them on the World Heritage List.

Opposition 
He was known to be an opponent of the Iraqi government, including during the 2019–2021 Iraqi protests. He was among the first to call for the accountability of former Prime Minister Adel Abdul-Mahdi (despite his kinship with him) for his use of force and brutality against peaceful demonstrators.

Political Party 
Dr. Laith Shubbar announced in 2020, the establishment of a political party called the Popular Movement for Change and Development. Its purpose is seeking to change the regime, holding the corrupt accountable, and prosecuting those who committed crimes against the Iraqi people.

References 

1967 births
Living people